Molly O'Keefe is an American author of contemporary romance. She is a two-time winner of Romance Writers of America's RITA Award for Best Contemporary Romance for Crazy Thing Called Love in 2014, and for Best Romance Novella for "The Christmas Eve Promise" in 2010.

Suicide Squad promotion and author reaction

Molly O'Keefe received notice in 2016 when one of their books, Between the Sheets, was featured in the second trailer and the ending scene of the 2016 film Suicide Squad, being read by the character Harley Quinn. On August 26, 2016, O'Keefe published an article on Bustle.com, revealing that she had nothing to do with her book appearing in the film, saying that:"the insulting and ridiculous stereotype of the passive, unhappy, unsatisfied woman who reads romance novels (which has always been bullshit) is utterly obliterated as Harley Quinn sips her tea and turns a page."

Biography
O'Keefe is from a small town outside of Chicago and attended university in St. Louis. She currently lives in Toronto, Ontario, Canada with her husband and two children.

Bibliography

Alatore

Boys of Bishop

Crooked Creek Ranch
1. 
2. 
2.5 
3.

Into The Wild

The Mitchells of Riverview Inn

The Notorious O'Neills

Everything I Left Unsaid

Stand-alone works

Awards and reception

 2005 - Romantic Times Reviewers Choice award for best Flipside for Dishing It Out
 2007 - Romantic Times Reviewers Choice award for best Superromance for Baby Makes Three
 2010 - Romance Writers of America RITA Award for Best Romance Novella for The Christmas Eve Promise
 2014 - Romantic Times Reviewers Choice award for best Contemporary Romance for Between the Sheets
 2014 - Romance Writers of America RITA Award for Best Contemporary Romance for Crazy Thing Called Love

She has also received starred reviews in Publishers Weekly and Booklist, as well as Top Picks in RT Book Reviews. Kirkus Reviews calls O'Keefe "...a master of explaining—and selling—character motivations.". NPR named Crazy Thing Called Love one of the best Love Story books of 2013.

References

External links 
 Author's blog
 Author's website
 Official publisher page at Harlequin

Living people
21st-century American novelists
American women novelists
American romantic fiction writers
RITA Award winners
Year of birth missing (living people)
21st-century American women writers
Women romantic fiction writers